BDW is a three-letter acronym that may refer to:

 Bart De Wever (born 1970), Flemish Belgian politician
 Billy Dee Williams (born 1937), American actor
 Brandon deWilde (1942–1972), American actor
 Boehm–Demers–Weiser garbage collector, in computer science
 The Book of Divine Worship, a religious text
 Banking Data Warehouse, a reference model for banking, an IBM product
  or Federal Association of German Hydroelectric Power Plants, Germany
 Business Data Warehouse, a data warehousing service
Big Daddy Weave, a contemporary Christian band